Adrian Ealy (born August 7, 1999) is an American football offensive tackle who is a free agent. He played college football at Oklahoma. He signed with the Baltimore Ravens after going undrafted in the 2021 NFL Draft.

College career 
Ealy did not play during 2017 as he was redshirted and played only five games in 2018 in a backup role. He was named the starter in 2019 and in 2020 playing and starting in all games. He was selected to the Second-team All-Big 12 team for those seasons.

Professional career

Baltimore Ravens
Ealy went undrafted in the 2021 NFL Draft; however, he shortly signed with the Baltimore Ravens as an undrafted free agent. He was waived by the Ravens in the final round of preseason roster cuts on August 31, 2021 and re-signed to their practice squad the next day. On October 11, 2021, Ealy was suspended without pay for six weeks after he violated the NFL policy on performance-enhancing substances.  He was released on November 23, 2021.

Denver Broncos
On November 30, 2021, Ealy was signed to the Denver Broncos practice squad. He was released on December 14, 2021.

Los Angeles Rams
On December 18, 2021, Ealy was signed to the Los Angeles Rams practice squad, but was released three days later.

Baltimore Ravens (second stint)
On December 23, 2021, Ealy was signed to the Baltimore Ravens practice squad, but was released four days later.

Green Bay Packers
On December 29, 2021, Ealy was signed to the Green Bay Packers practice squad. He was released on January 11, 2022.

Los Angeles Rams (second stint)
On February 11, 2022, Ealy signed a reserve/future contract with the Los Angeles Rams. He was released on August 16, 2022.

Pittsburgh Steelers
On August 22, 2022, Ealy signed with the Pittsburgh Steelers. He was released on August 30, 2022.

References

External links 
 
 Baltimore Ravens profile
 Oklahoma Sooners profile

1999 births
Living people
People from Gonzales, Louisiana
Players of American football from Louisiana
American football offensive tackles
Oklahoma Sooners football players
Baltimore Ravens players
Denver Broncos players
Los Angeles Rams players
Green Bay Packers players
Pittsburgh Steelers players